Jonathan Watson is a Scottish actor best known for his comedy sketch show Only an Excuse?, which parodied people and events from the world of Scottish football, as well as roles in the BBC comedies Bob Servant Independent in which he appears with Brian Cox, and as Colin in the acclaimed Two Doors Down. In the 1980s he was also a regular cast member of the Scottish sitcom City Lights and the sketch show Naked Video.

Background
Watson was born in Glasgow and was educated at Hillhead Primary and Hillhead High School. He trained at the Royal Scottish Academy of Music and Drama and graduated in 1979. He joined the TAG Theatre Company then followed this with a season with the 7:84 company. He had a part in Bill Forsyth's 1983 film Local Hero.

He moved to London in 1986 and returned to Scotland two years later.

He appeared in all five seasons of Naked Video that were broadcast on BBC Scotland between 1986 and 1991, He was also in City Lights, Rab C. Nesbitt and Only an Excuse?.

In 2013, Watson appeared in Rob Drummond's Quiz Show at the Traverse Theatre in Edinburgh. In 2014 he played Archie in John Byrne's adaptation of Chekhov's The Three Sisters for The Tron, Glasgow. He was also in The National Theatre of Scotland's production of Yer Granny, which toured Scotland & Northern Ireland.

He appeared in the horror film Let Us Prey which was released in 2015.

Early television appearances included minor parts in The Bill and Casualty. In Bob Servant which sees him playing opposite Brian Cox, as Bob's trusty sidekick - Frank.

Following the success of a one-hour pilot, a six-part comedy series Two Doors Down was made which screened on BBC2 beginning in March 2016.

Watson is a supporter of Rangers F.C.

From December 2019 to January 2020, Watson played King Hector in the pantomime Jack and the Beanstalk at the King's Theatre, Glasgow

In 2021 he appeared in Doctor Who - Flux as Sontarans 'Commander Riskaw' and 'Skaak'.

Comedy impressions
Watson's Wind Up was a political satire show that was aired on BBC Radio Scotland. The show was recorded on Fridays at the Glasgow Film Theatre.

Bob Servant Independent
Watson's appeared as Frank (Francis) the campaign manager of local cheeseburger magnate in the cult BBC Four Neil Forsyth comedy Bob Servant Independent. This show was first broadcast in the UK in January/February 2013; with a move planned to BBC2 later in the year.

References

External links

Scottish male television actors
Living people
People educated at Hillhead High School
Scottish male comedians
Comedians from Glasgow
Male actors from Glasgow
1957 births